The Old World orioles (Oriolidae) are an Old World family of passerine birds.

Taxonomy and systematics
The family Oriolidae comprises the piopios, figbirds, pitohuis and the Old World orioles. The piopios were added 2011, having been formerly placed in the family Turnagridae. Several other genera have been proposed to split up the genus Oriolus. For example, the African black-headed species are sometimes placed in a separate genus, Baruffius. The family Oriolidae is not related to the New World orioles, despite their similar size, diet, behaviour and contrasting plumage patterns. Rather, these similarities are an  example of convergent evolution.

Extant genera
There are three extant genera in the family Oriolidae:

Extinct genera
There are at least two extinct genera in the family Oriolidae:
 Genus Turnagra – piopios (2 extinct species)
 Genus Longmornis – Longmornis robustirostrata

Description
The orioles and figbirds are medium-sized passerines, around 20–30 cm in length, with the females only slightly smaller than the males. The beak is slightly curved and hooked, and, except in the figbirds, as long again as the head. The plumage of most species is bright and showy, although the females often have duller plumage than the males do. The plumage of many Australasian orioles mimics that of friarbirds (a genus of large honeyeaters), probably to reduce aggression against the smaller orioles.

Distribution and habitat
The family is distributed across Africa, Europe, Asia, and Australia. The few temperate nesting species are migratory, and some tropical species also show seasonal movements.

Behaviour and ecology

Breeding
Orioles are monogamous, breeding in territorial pairs (although the Australasian figbird, and possibly also the other figbirds, breed in loose colonies). Nesting sites may be chosen near aggressive species such as drongos, shrikes or friarbirds, which confer a degree of protection. The nest is a deep woven cup suspended like a hammock from a branch. They usually lay two or three eggs, but as many as six have been recorded.

Food and feeding
Orioles are arboreal and tend to feed in the canopy. Many species are able to survive in open forests and woodlands, although a few are restricted to closed forest. They are opportunistic omnivores, with the main components of their diet being fruit, berries, arthropods, and nectar.

References

Further reading

External links

 Internet Bird Collection.com: Oriole videos
 Orioles on a feeder 

Passeri
Taxa named by Nicholas Aylward Vigors